G 2/06 is a decision by the Enlarged Board of Appeal of the European Patent Office (EPO), which issued on 25 November 2008. In its answer to question 2, the Enlarged Board of Appeal ruled that " (formerly []) forbids the patenting of claims directed to products which – as described in the application – at the filing date could be prepared exclusively by a method which necessarily involved the destruction of the human embryos from which the said products are derived, even if the said method is not part of the claims." In short, a patent under the European Patent Convention (EPC) cannot be granted for an invention which necessarily involves the use and destruction of human embryos.

The reactions to the decision were mixed. According to Reuters, the decision could stifle research by stem cell companies for commercial purposes. In contrast, according to the Guardian, "some experts believe this will provide a boost for European companies developing technologies based on human embryonic stem cells".

References

External links 
 Decision G 2/06, Official Journal EPO 5/2009, 306
 No European patent for WARF/Thomson stem cell application, EPO web site, News, 27 November 2008.
 , entitled "Primate Embryonic Stem Cells", applied for by the Wisconsin Alumni Research Foundation, and which was the subject of the referral to the Enlarged Board of Appeal.

G 2006 2
Stem cells
2008 in case law
2008 in Europe